Lake Kushaqua is a  lake near Loon Lake and Rainbow Lake in the town of Franklin, New York state. It is on the North Branch of the Saranac River. The shoreline is state owned except for two small inholdings. The New York State Department of Environmental Conservation operates a campground on Kushaqua and nearby Buck Pond.

It was the site of the Lake Kushaqua Hotel, built in 1893, which was one of the first hotels in the Adirondacks with electric lighting. It was accessible via the Chateaugay Railroad and the Adirondack Division of the New York Central Railroad, which passed the lake on either side.

In 1901, the Stony Wold Sanatorium was built on 1800 acres bordering the lake.

The rail bed of the Delaware and Hudson line runs along the eastern shore of the lake, past the Buck Pond campground, and that of the Adirondack Division of the New York Central Railroad runs along the western shore past the remaining buildings of Stony Wold: the beautiful chapel and two cottages on the lake shore. When it was built, the  sanatorium property included all of Lake Kushaqua and nearby Buck Pond, purchased in 1901 for $20,000. When the sanatorium closed in the 1950s, it was given to the White Fathers of Africa; they sold it to the state in 1970, after which the huge main building, laundry and power plant were destroyed.

References

Sources
 Historic Saranac Lake Wiki (Creative Commons Attribution License)
 New York Times, September 3, 1893, "'Beautiful Resting Place, Such Is Lake Kushaqua In The Adirondacks"
 Frederick J. Seaver, Historical Sketches of Franklin County, Albany, NY: J. B. Lyon Co., 1918, Chapter XVI, Franklin
 Adirondack Daily Enterprise, February 17, 1959, "White Fathers Plans For Stony Wold Set"

Adirondacks
Kushaqua
Protected areas of Franklin County, New York
Kushaqua